Iteb Zaibet (born December 23, 1986), better known as his stage name Swagg Man, is a French rapper and personality from Paris.

Biography
Swagg Man released a rap album titled Swagg Man Posey on 27 June 2014 in France. He currently lives in Miami, Florida. He has the Louis Vuitton logo tattooed on his head. His single "Billey" charted at #189 in Singles Fusionnes for the 20th week of 2014 on the French Singles Chart. The song accompanied by a music video gained media attention throughout France. Swagg Man was featured in a French article for the single for Vice.

In February 2023, Swagg Man was sentenced to twenty years in prison in Tunisia after being found guilty of twenty counts of fraud. He subsequently expressed his intention to appeal the decision, and publicly renounced his Tunisian citizenship.

Discography

Albums

Singles

Other releases
"Hotel"
"F****n Tonight"
"Black Card"
"Suicidey"
"J'ai pas le temps"
"Avortey"
"Posey"
"Kiffey"
"Get Money"
"Lambo"
"Tu Es Fan"
"Impressionnant"
"Crois En Tes Rêves"
"Candy Girl"
"Siliconey"
"La Cess"

Notes

References

External links
 

Living people
1988 births
Rappers from Paris
French expatriates in the United States